Jekyll is a Cornish and Breton family name. Notable people with the surname include:

Dame Agnes Jekyll (1861–1937), British artist, writer and philanthropist
Gertrude Jekyll (1843–1932), British gardener
Sir Joseph Jekyll (1663–1738), British lawyer, politician and judge
Olga Jekyll (1918–2014), New Zealand fencer 
Walter Jekyll (1849–1929),  English clergyman, brother of Gertrude

Fictional
 Dr Henry Jekyll, fictional character from the novel Strange Case of Dr Jekyll and Mr Hyde

The modern Breton form is Gicquel (fr).

References